Jackson High School is the name of several high schools in the United States:

 Jackson High School (Georgia), Jackson, Georgia
 Jackson High School (Jackson, Ohio)
 Jackson High School (Stark County, Ohio)
 Jackson High School (Oregon), Portland, Oregon
 Jackson High School (Michigan), Jackson, Michigan
 Jackson High School (Missouri), Jackson, Missouri
 Andrew Jackson High School (Jacksonville)
 Andrew Jackson High School (South Carolina), Kershaw, South Carolina
 Andrew Jackson High School (Queens)
 Jackson Memorial High School, Jackson Township, New Jersey
 Miami Jackson High School, Miami, Florida
 Henry M. Jackson High School, Mill Creek, Washington
 The high school component of Jackson City School, a K-12 facility in Jackson, Kentucky

See also
 Stonewall Jackson High School (disambiguation)
 A. Y. Jackson Secondary School (disambiguation)
 Jackson Middle School (disambiguation)
 Jackson School (disambiguation)